A briefcase is a case for carrying documents. The term may also refer to:

In computing:
Briefcase (Microsoft Windows)
Yahoo! Briefcase, formerly a free file hosting service by Yahoo!
Briefcase, a virtual file system used in DOS Navigator orthodox file manager
Briefcase, a term used in horse training to describe the act of getting the horse used to a bridle
The Briefcase, a CBS reality television series
The Briefcase (Australia), a Channel Nine reality television series